William Sacheverell (1638 – 9 October 1691) was an English politician who sat in the House of Commons in two periods between 1670 and 1691.

Life
Sacheverell was the son of Henry Sacheverell, a country gentleman, by his wife Joyce Mansfield.  His family had been prominent in Derbyshire and Nottinghamshire since the 12th century; William inherited large estates from his father. He was admitted to Gray's Inn in 1667, and in 1670 he was elected Member of Parliament for Derbyshire. He immediately gained a prominent position in the party hostile to the Court, and before he had been in the House of Commons for six months, he proposed a resolution that all "popish recusants" should be removed from military commands; the motion, enlarged so as to include civil employment, was carried without a division on 28 February 1672–1673. This resolution was the forerunner of the Test Act, in the preparation of which Sacheverell took an active part, and which caused the breakup of the cabal.

Sacheverell took part in nearly every debate in the House of Commons, and was recognized as one of the most able leaders of the opposition or "Country Party". He strongly opposed the king's alliance with France, advocating a league with the Dutch and the refusal of supplies until the demands of the Commons should be complied with. Sacheverell took a special interest in the navy and spoke in many debates on this question. In 1677 he carried an address to the king calling upon him to conclude an alliance with the United Provinces against Louis XIV of France, and when the Speaker adjourned the House by Charles's order Sacheverell made an eloquent protest, asserting the right of the House itself to decide the question of its adjournment. When parliament met early in 1678 assurances were received from Charles that he had arranged the treaties demanded by the Commons; but Sacheverell boldly questioned the king's good faith, and warned the Commons that they were being deceived. When the secret treaty with France became known, confirming Sacheverell's insight, he called for the disbandment of the forces and advocated the refusal of further supplies for military purposes; and in June 1678 he resolutely opposed Lord Danby's proposal to grant £300,000 per annum to Charles II for life. Jean Barillon mentions Sacheverell among the Whig leaders who accepted bribes from Louis XIV, but the evidence against him is not conclusive.

When Titus Oates began his "revelations" in 1678, Sacheverell was among those who most firmly believed in the existence of a Popish Plot. He was one of the most active investigators of the affair, and one of the managers in the impeachment of the five Catholic peers. He also acted for a time as chairman of the secret committee of the Commons, and drew up the report on the examination of the Jesuit Coleman, secretary to Mary of Modena, the Duchess of York. He was a member of the committee that drafted the articles of impeachment against Danby in 1678, and was appointed one of the managers of the Commons; and in 1679, when the impeachment, interrupted by the dissolution of parliament, was resumed in the new parliament, he spoke strongly against the validity of Danby's plea of pardon by the king.

The allegations in Sacheverell's report on the examination of Coleman prompted the country party to demand the exclusion of James, Duke of York, from the succession to the throne, the first suggestion of the famous Exclusion Bill being made by Sacheverell on 4 November 1678 in a debate--"the greatest that ever was in Parliament," as it was pronounced by contemporaries—raised by Lord Russell with the object of removing the duke from the King's Council. He vigorously promoted the bill in the House of Commons and opposed granting supplies until it should pass. When Charles offered an alternative scheme (1679) for limiting the powers of a Catholic sovereign, Sacheverell made a great speech in which he pointed out the insufficiency of the king's terms for securing the object desired by the Whigs. In the conflict between the Petitioners and the Abhorrers he supported the former, and on 27 October 1680 brought forward a motion asserting the right of petitioning the king to summon parliament, and proposed the impeachment of Chief Justice North as the author of the proclamation against tumultuous petitioning. Sacheverell was one of the managers on behalf of the Commons at the trial of Lord Stafford in Westminster Hall; but took no further part in public affairs till after the elections of March 1681, when he was returned unopposed for Derbyshire. He was prosecuted for riot in connection with the surrender of the charter of Nottingham in 1682, and tried before George Jeffreys, who fined him 500 marks.

At the general election following the death of Charles II in 1685 Sacheverell lost his seat, and for the next four years he lived in retirement on his estates. In the Convention Parliament summoned by William III in 1689, he sat for Heytesbury. He spoke in favour of a radical resettlement of the constitution, and served on a committee, of which Somers was chairman, for drawing up a new constitution in the form of the Declaration of Right; he was one of the representatives of the Commons in their conference with the peers on the question of declaring the throne vacant. William III appointed Sacheverell a lord of the admiralty, but he resigned the office after a few months. He procured the omission of Lord Jeffreys's name from the Act of Indemnity.

In 1690 Sacheverell moved a famous amendment to the Corporation Bill, proposing the addition of a clause for disqualifying for office for seven years municipal functionaries who had surrendered their charters to the Crown. A celebrated debate on this question took place in the House of Commons in January 1690; but the evident intention of the Whigs to perpetuate their own ascendancy by tampering with the franchise contributed largely to the Tory reaction which resulted in the defeat of the Whigs in the elections of that year. Sacheverell was elected member for Nottinghamshire; but be died before taking his seat.

In the judgment of Speaker Onslow, Sacheverell was the "ablest parliament man" of the reign of Charles II. He was one of the earliest English parliamentary orators; his speeches greatly impressed his contemporaries, and in a later generation, as Thomas Macaulay observes, they were "a favourite theme of old men who lived to see the conflicts of Robert Walpole and William Pulteney. Though his fame has become dimmed in comparison with that of Shaftesbury, Russell and Sidney, he was equally conspicuous in the parliamentary proceedings of Charles II's reign, and left a more permanent mark than any of them on the constitutional changes of the period."

Family
Sacheverell was twice married. His first wife was Mary, daughter of William Staunton of Staunton; and his second was Jane, daughter of Sir John Newton. His eldest son, Robert, represented the borough of Nottingham in six parliaments. The family became extinct in the male line in 1724.

References

Bibliography

Many of Sacheverell's speeches are reported in Anchitell Grey, Debates of the House of Commons, 1667–1694 (10 vols., 1769).
 Sir John Reresby, Memoirs, 1634–1689, edited by J. J. Cartwright. (1875);
 Roger North, Autobiography, edited by Augustus Jessopp (1887);
 Lives of the Right Hon. F. North, Baron Guilford, etc. (3 vols., London, 1826);
 The Hatton Correspondence, edited by E. M. Thompson for the Camden Society (2 vols., 1878);
 Laurence Eachard, History of England 5 vols., 1707–1718).

1638 births
1691 deaths
Members of the Parliament of England (pre-1707) for constituencies in Derbyshire
Lords of the Admiralty
English MPs 1661–1679
English MPs 1679
English MPs 1680–1681
English MPs 1681
English MPs 1689–1690
English MPs 1690–1695